His Royal Highness is a style used to address or refer to some members of royal families. It may also refer to:

His Royal Highness (1918 film), silent film starring Evelyn Greeley
 His Royal Highness (1932 film), Australian film
 His Royal Highness (1953 film), German film

See also
 Her Royal Highness..?, comedy play